National Anti-Corruption Bureau of Ukraine (НАБУ) or NABU is a Ukrainian law enforcement anti-corruption agency which investigates corruption in Ukraine and prepares cases for prosecution. It has investigatory powers but cannot indict suspects. Only agency findings passed to the Specialized Anti-Corruption Prosecutor's Office become a part of criminal case.

The agency was established in 2014 after its predecessor, the National Anti-Corruption Committee was considered a failure. The bureau was created on the request of the International Monetary Fund.

The agency is set to employ 700 people. Its first 70 detectives started work on 1 October 2015.

The agency's government funding is mandated under American and European Union aid programs. It has an evidence-sharing agreement with the FBI.

Such values as integrity, courage, determination and commitment are considered as the main for official appoint candidates and the whole state body.

The Ukrainian government also employs the National Agency for Prevention of Corruption which works to prevent corruption by monitoring government officials' lifestyles.

History

National Anti-Corruption Committee 
The position of Commissioner for anti-corruption policy was established by the second Tymoshenko Government on April 24, 2009. Its first meeting took place on 22 April 2010; at the time most of its members were government officials. In September 2011 then President of Ukraine Viktor Yanukovych became head of the National Anti-Corruption Committee, while the Justice Minister served as the secretary of the committee. At that time the committee was tasked to give systematic analysis and to develop measures to combat corruption.

Commissioner for anti-corruption policy 

6 March 2014 Tetiana Chornovol become the Commissioner for anti-corruption policy. At the time the organization was set to employ 1,200 people in seven regional offices. Chornovol resigned on 18 August 2014 because "there is no political will in Ukraine to carry out a hard-edged, large-scale war against corruption".

Anti-Corruption Bureau
Founding and launching the National Anti-Corruption Bureau was one of the requirements set by the IMF and the European Commission for relaxation of visa restrictions between Ukraine and the European Union.

On 14 October 2014 Verkhovna Rada of Ukraine adopted the Law "On the National Anti-Corruption Bureau of Ukraine".

In January 2015 for the first time in history of modern Ukraine an open competition for position of director of a state agency was announced. 186 candidates applied for the position of Director of the National Anti-corruption Bureau of Ukraine. The winner of the competition was Artem Sytnyk.

On 16 April 2015 the President of Ukraine Petro Poroshenko signed two decrees: No. 217/2015 – decree on founding the National Anti-corruption Bureau of Ukraine and No.218/2015 — decree on appointing Artem Sytnyk the Bureau's Director. This provided a starting point for a new state agency. The first order signed by the NABU Director on 23 April 2015 approved the Bureau's structure and staffing. On 24 April Gizo Uglava was appointed First Deputy Director. When Gizo Uglava was hired by Artem Sytnyk he said:"Ukraine matters to Georgia, we believe that if we save Georgia, we save Ukraine, and the other way round. Moreover, that’s my chance to do what I love – to investigate".
Later two more Deputy Directors were appointed: Anatoly Novak and Tetyana Varvarska.
On 7 May the Bureau was given premises At 3 Vasylya Surykova street, Kyiv.

On 30 November 2015 the competition for the position of the Head of the Specialized Anti-Corruption Prosecutor's Office, on which the start of the NABU work depended, was over. Nazar Kholodnitskiy took the position.
On 4 December the NABU detectives entered the first three criminal proceedings concerning the theft of state owned companies' funds to the value of 1 billion UAH into the Unified Register of Pre-Trial Investigations.

The agency's detectives underwent training sponsored by the U.S. Federal Bureau of Investigation and the European Union.

From June 2017 the NABU Director is a member of the EUACI's Steering Committee. The National Anti-Corruption Bureau is one of the beneficiaries this program.

2019 
On February 25, the group of anti-corruption investigations "Bigus.Info" published the report about the people from Petro Poroshenko's surrounding who are in control of thefts in the defense sector. In March, two criminal proceedings were opened regarding involvement of people from Petro Poroshenko's team in the theft in the defense sphere. Ex-First Deputy Secretary of the National Security and Defense Council Oleh Hladkovsky, his son Ihor and other persons were searched.

In November, the Bureau served notice of suspicion to one of the richest Ukrainians, Oleg Bakhmatyuk, over the NBU's takeover of a $1.2bn USD loan.

In November, the deputy chief of the Kyiv City Customs and the Odessa businessman Vadim Alperin, whom the media called "the king" and the "godfather" of Ukrainian smuggling, was detained. Investigators assert he unsuccessfully offered NABU detective a bribe of $800,000.

Scandal related to U.S. presidential election 2020 
Ukrainian media has repeatedly published information about the connections, interventions and influence on the activities of NABU of the US Embassy in Ukraine.

In October 2019, Ukrainian MP and graduate of the KGB school Andrii Derkach published documents about the possible influence of the US Embassy in Ukraine on the activities of NABU. Among the published materials were correspondence between Polina Chyzh, the assistant to the first deputy head of NABU Gizo Uglava, and Hanna Emelyanova, the specialist on legal issues of the anti-corruption program of the US Department of Justice of the US Embassy in Ukraine. According to Derkach, this correspondence contained lists of criminal cases on which NABU detectives worked, as well as instructions on providing information on the case of former Minister of Environmental Protection and owner of Burisma Mykola Zlochevsky. According to Derkach, American politician Joe Biden influenced the Ukrainian authorities and helped to close criminal cases related to the activities of former Minister Mykola Zlochevsky.

In April 2020, former Prosecutor General of Ukraine Viktor Shokin expressed the opinion that the initiator of the establishment of NABU in 2015 was the then US Vice President Joe Biden in order to "steal the investigation powers from the State Bureau of Investigation to NABU and put there emissaries who listen to the United States". Victor Shokin has previously complained about pressure on his activities from Biden in the investigation of the Burisma case and wrote a statement to the State Bureau of Investigation about the disclosure a secret information by NABU staff and Shokin's personal data leak to US embassy in Ukraine.

On September 10, 2020 the United States imposed sanctions on Andriy Derkach among other Russian agents for attempting to influence the U.S. electoral process.

The legislative authority

Duties 

 performing investigative and police operations;
 conducting the pre-trial inquiry of criminal crimes which belong to their jurisdiction or other, defined by law;
 checking for virtuous persons who are authorized to the execution of state's functions and local self-governance;
 undertaking activities of the police search and an arrest of funds and another property which can objects for compensation, also saving funds and other property which were arrested;
 interacting with other state bodies, bodies of local self-governance and other subjects for execution its duties;
 performing informational and analytical work;
 providing personal security of National Buro workers and other persons who are determined by law;
 under confidentiality and volunteering, providing cooperation with persons, who report about corruption;
 reporting about its activity and informing society about the results of its work.

Rights 

 to open investigative cases based on the decree which is approved by the head of the relevant subunit of National Buro and to  conduct transparent and unspoken investigative activities;
 according to the head's decision which is agreed with a prosecutor, to demand investigative and criminal implementations from other law enforcement agencies;
 due to the decision of the head of the structural subunit of NABU to demand statements about the property, incomes, expenses, financial duties of persons, statements about the funds using of the State Budget of Ukraine, the disposal of state or communal property. NABU has a direct access to public automated informational and reference systems, registers, and a data bank, use the state's means of communication, the networks of the special connections and other technical means;
 to search documents and another material sources of information which are necessary to prevent, identify, interrupt and investigate criminal crimes, in particular, those which consist limited information;
 according to the head or his vice's decision which is approved by the prosecutor, to receive information from banks, depository, financial and other institutions, interprices and organizations about operations, accounts, contributions, bargains of natural and legal person;
 on the basis of the relevant court's decision to seal up archives, cash registers, premises (except living places) or other storages, took them under protection, also to take out items and documents in order which is provided by Criminal Procedure Law;
 to attract qualified specialists and experts from any institutions, organizations, control and financial bodies on the voluntary basis, including contractual conditions;
 on the basis of the written decision of the head or the vice of NABU which is agreed by the prosecutor, to create common investigation groups which include operational and investigation workers;
 to enter freely to the state bodies, the bodies of local self-governance and a zone of customs control by providing a court certificate, also to enter freely to the military corps and institutions, border posts of Ukraine by providing written disposal of the head or his vice;
 to use transport means which belong to natural and legal person (except transport means of diplomatic, consular and other representations of foreign states and organizations, special vehicles with further refund of losses;
 to send to the state bodies, the bodies of local self-governance compulsory for the consideration of proposals and recommendations for eliminations reasons and conditions which promote criminal crimes, and also to receive information about their consideration during 30 days;
 to cooperate with natural persons including the contractual ground and stick to the conditions of voluntariness and confidentiality  of these relations, to stimulate people in material and moral way who provide assistance;
 to sue in case the recognition of agreements' invalidity;
 to create informational systems and keep an operating account;
 to hold, carry and use of firearms and special means, and also carry out activities of physical influence;
 to issue firearms, special means of individual protection and notifications about the danger to protected persons;
 to cooperate with the competent bodies of foreign states, international organizations;
 to receive materials which are provided within the frameworks of international law assistance from the procuratorial authorities and Ministry of Justice;
 to act as a representative of the state's interests during the performance in case management  of the police search, arrest, confiscation and return of the appropriate property to Ukraine, the defense of rights and interests of state, and also to attract legal advisers for such purposes;
 to raise the issue of the establishment of the special conditions (including the issue of classifying location) in places of imprisonment for people who cooperate with NABU

Relationship with other anti-corruption bodies 

NABU is one of three anti-corruption pillar institutions in Ukraine, created after the Euromaidan.

National Agency for Prevention of Corruption 
The National Agency for Prevention of Corruption seeks to 'shape and implement anti-corruption policy while creating an environment conducive to corruption prevention'. While NABU focuses on law-enforcement, the NACP shapes policy and develops regulations that help to prevent corruption and ensures compliance.

It is responsible for verifying the accuracy of government officials' asset and income declarations. In July 2016, its civil society representative, Ruslan Riaboshapka, criticised the hiring process, saying that the agency was choosing the lowest-scoring candidates.

Specialized Anti-Corruption Prosecutor's Office 

The Specialized Anti-Corruption Prosecutor's Office (SAPO) supports and oversees criminal investigations launched by NABU, by drawing up indictments and bringing them before the courts.

Control over the bureau
The direct control over the bureau is conducted by the parliamentary committee for combating organized crime and corruption.

The NABU director
 informs the President, Verkhovna Rada, and the Cabinet about key issues in operation of the NABU and its regional centers, about execution of assigned tasks, compliance with the law, rights and freedoms of individuals;
 every year in February and August submits a written report to the President, Verkhovna Rada, and the Cabinet of Ministers about operations of the NABU during the previous six months.
Every year the External Control Commission provide an independent assessment of the NABU's activity. There are three members of the commission:

 Buromenskyi Mykhailo (from the Cabinet of Ministers of Ukraine) - appointed to the post on May 26, 2017;
 Vasylenko Volodymyr (from the Verkhovna Rada) - appointed to the post on  June 7, 2018;
 Zhebrivskyi Pavlo (from the President of Ukraine) - appointed to the post on June 19, 2018).
For securing transparency and civil control over the NABU the Council of Civil Control was created. It counts 15 members who have to take an examination based on an open and transparent competition.

On June 5, 2015, there was the first open e-voting for the candidates to the Council of Civil Control. Due to the results of the e-voting 15 members who represent 6 civil society organizations were elected. After the elections to the Council of Civil Control, its members have chosen Vitalii Shabunin as the head of the council. Then the e-voting was defined as illegal by the claim of Sh. Aliev but the claim was not proceed till the end of the cadence.

The second Council of Civil Control which was headed by Roman Maselko and started to work on May 31, 2017. The secretary of the second Council of Civil Control became Halyna Yanchenko. Among the challenges which face the second CCC were the finishing of command forming, functional work organization of local territory administrations, the rising number of investigations, the finishing the stage of judicial review of NABU implementations. That voting also was defined as illegal by the claim of O.Shevchyk but the claim was not proceed till the end of the cadence.

The elections to the 3rd Council of Civil Control took place on May 30, 2018. The head of the Council became Tetiana Locatska.

Chairman of the National Anti-Corruption Bureau of Ukraine
 Semen Kryvonos (since March 2023)

See also

References

External links 
Official website 

Government agencies of Ukraine
2014 establishments in Ukraine
Government agencies established in 2014
Euromaidan
Corruption in Ukraine
Specialist law enforcement agencies of Ukraine
Anti-corruption agencies
Institutions with the title of National in Ukraine